Société Sportive La Jeanne d'Arc, is a football club from Le Port, Réunion Island.

Stadium
The club plays their home matches at Stade Georges Lambrakis, which has a maximum capacity of  people.

Achievements
Réunion Premier League: 1
1952

Coupe de la Réunion: 4
1958, 1960, 1967, 2001

Performance in CAF competitions
CAF Cup Winners' Cup: 1 appearance
2002 – Second Round

The club in the French football structure
French Cup: 1 appearance
1999–00

Squad

External links
Official Site

Jeanne d'Arc
Association football clubs established in 1927
1927 establishments in Réunion